Charlotte Mühe (January 24, 1910 in Uelzen – January 10, 1981 in Magdeburg) was a German swimmer who competed in the 1928 Summer Olympics.

In the 1928 Olympics she won a bronze medal in the 200 m breaststroke event.

External links

1910 births
1981 deaths
German female swimmers
German female breaststroke swimmers
Olympic swimmers of Germany
Swimmers at the 1928 Summer Olympics
Olympic bronze medalists for Germany
Olympic bronze medalists in swimming
European Aquatics Championships medalists in swimming
Medalists at the 1928 Summer Olympics
People from Uelzen
Sportspeople from Lower Saxony
20th-century German women